Anatoli Droga (born 26 January 1969) is a Ukrainian judoka. He is currently a trainer of the Dnipro judo federation.

Achievements

References

External links

1969 births
Living people
Ukrainian male judoka
Place of birth missing (living people)